Urs Egger (born 9 March 1953 in Bern – died 18 January 2020 in Berlin) was a Swiss film and television director.

From 1974 to 1997, he worked for the Swiss Neue Zürcher Zeitung and the Australian Cinema Papers as a correspondent from Los Angeles, responsible for reporting on the film industry. He visited the American Film Institute to become a director.

Egger died in January 2020 in Berlin, Germany, after suffering a long illness.

Select filmography 
 Kinder der Landstrasse (1992)
 The Tourist (1996, TV film)
  (1996, TV film) — remake of Teenage Wolfpack
 Opernball (1998, TV film) — based on Opernball
  (2002)
  (2004, TV film) — based on The Return of the Dancing Master
  (2008, TV film)
 Kennedys Hirn (2010, TV film) — based on Kennedy's Brain
  (2010, TV film) — based on the novel Brother Grimm by Craig Russell
 Krokodil (2013, TV film)
  (2014, TV film)
 Gotthard (2016, TV film)
 Das Wunder von Wörgl (2018, TV film)

External links

Urs Egger at the Swiss Film Directory

1955 births
2020 deaths
German-language film directors
Swiss film directors
Swiss television directors